Fusha is a town situated at the northern periphery of the city of Zhongshan, Guangdong province. The population of Fusha has 57,570 residents.

See also
Shatian dialect

External links
Fusha Government Website

Zhongshan
Township-level divisions of Guangdong